The VTB United League Hall of Fame (VTBHOF) is a hall of fame that honours individuals that have made important contributions to the premiere professional basketball league in Russia, the VTB United League, through their sporting contributions in the game. The VTB United League Hall of Fame's inaugural class was inducted during the VTB United League All-Star Game, in February 2019.

Inductees

Players
For basketball players that have been among the most important players at the club level in the VTB United League.

Player nationalities listed by national team affiliation:

Head coaches
For head coaches that have been among the most important coaches at the club level in the VTB United League.

See also
College Basketball Hall of Fame
Basketball Hall of Fame
 List of members of the Naismith Memorial Basketball Hall of Fame
 List of players in the Naismith Memorial Basketball Hall of Fame
 List of coaches in the Naismith Memorial Basketball Hall of Fame
FIBA Hall of Fame
 List of members of the FIBA Hall of Fame
EuroLeague Hall of Fame
Italian Basketball Hall of Fame
Greek Basket League Hall of Fame
French Basketball Hall of Fame
Finnish Basketball Hall of Fame
Australian Basketball Hall of Fame
Philippine Basketball Association Hall of Fame
Women's Basketball Hall of Fame

References

External links
Official website 
VTB United League first Hall of Fame class
Milos Teodosic and Ettore Messina among the inductees in the VTB League Hall of Fame
Presented the Hall of fame of VTB United League

2019 establishments in Russia
Awards established in 2019
Basketball in Russia
Basketball museums and halls of fame
European basketball awards